HMS Jackal (alternatively  spelled Jackall) was a Jackal-class second-class iron paddle gunvessel of the Royal Navy.

Design
Orders for Jackal and her sister  were placed on 16 January 1844. They were designed by the builder, Robert Napier and Sons and approved on 17 April 1844 by the Surveyor of the Navy, Sir William Symonds.

Jackal was fitted with a Napier two-cylinder side-lever steam engine driving side paddles. The engine was rated at 150 nominal horsepower and on trials developed . She was provided with two gaff-rigged masts, making her a schooner. Her armament consisted of a single 18-pounder (22cwt) carronade on a pivot mounting and two 24-pounder (13cwt) carronades.

Construction
Both ships were built at Napier's Govan yard. Jackall was built as yard number 8, and Lizard as number 9.  Jackall was launched on 28 November 1844, and Lizard followed exactly a month later. After fitting out, Jackalls first commissioning took place on 22 September 1845.

Service
After commissioning at Plymouth in 1846, Jackall served in the Mediterranean. In February 1847, she ran aground and was damaged at Lisbon, Portugal. By 1851 she was a store ship at Ascension Island. She paid off at Sheerness in May 1859 and was recommissioned in December of the same year.

She was again paid off at Keyham, Devon on 8 February 1864, recommissioned the next day.

By 1864 she was employed on fishery protection duties off the west coast of Scotland. On 11 April 1872, she ran aground at the mouth of the River Aray. She was refloated and anchored in Inveraray Bay.

Fate
She was sold for breaking up in November 1887.

Notes

References

 
 

 

Ships built on the River Clyde
1844 ships
Victorian-era gunboats of the United Kingdom
Gunvessels of the Royal Navy
Maritime incidents in February 1847
Maritime incidents in April 1872